Micropterix rothenbachii is a species of moth belonging to the family Micropterigidae that was described by Heinrich Frey in 1856. It is known from Italy, Sicily, Austria, France, Switzerland, Germany, Croatia and Slovenia.

Imagines

References

Micropterigidae
Moths described in 1956
Moths of Europe
Taxa named by Heinrich Frey